Chen Yuhao (born 15 November 2001) is a Chinese footballer currently playing as a defender for Wuhan.

Career statistics

Club
.

References

2001 births
Living people
Chinese footballers
China youth international footballers
Association football defenders
Dalian Transcendence F.C. players
Wuhan F.C. players